Diary of a Mad Band: Europe in the Year of VI is a live album by sludge/Southern metal band Down. It was released on CD/DVD on October 5, 2010. It is the final Down album to feature Rex Brown as bassist.

Content
Diary of a Mad Band features a two-CD full concert recorded in London. The 130-minute DVD features footage documenting the 2006 return of Down from the practice room through the band's first European tour, and a bonus behind-the-scenes featurette entitled "Tyrades and Shananigans".

The album is often mislabeled as "Down IV" as it is the fourth release by Down, although it is not a studio album. Another reason for this is that on the album's artwork, the Roman numeral for 6 (VI) is present. The Roman numeral for 6 is present because the album was recorded in 2006 (In the year of VI).

The vinyl release features completely different artwork under the title Threefold Live.

Legal issues and delay
The live album was originally set for release on March 23, 2010. However, due to legal issues the album's release date was pushed back to October 5.

Track listing

Disc 1

Disc 2

Credits
Down
 Phil Anselmo – vocals
 Pepper Keenan – guitars
 Kirk Windstein – guitars
 Jimmy Bower – drums
 Rex Brown – bass

Other
Layout and design – Pepper Keenan and Vance Kelly
Artwork – Vance Kelly

Tour dates

Note: Dates June 12, 13, and 24 do not appear on the album.

References

2010 albums
Down (band) albums